Hayter is a hamlet in central Alberta, Canada within the Municipal District of Provost No. 52. It was founded in 1909 and named after the president of CP Hotels.

Demographics 

See also 
List of communities in Alberta
List of designated places in Alberta
List of hamlets in Alberta

References 

Hamlets in Alberta
Designated places in Alberta
Municipal District of Provost No. 52